Ellen Mason may refer to:
 Ellen Francis Mason, New England author, civic leader, translator, and philanthropist
 Ellen Huntly Bullard Mason, American Baptist foreign missionary and writer